Duet is a 2014 animated short film created by former Disney animator Glen Keane. The project was done in conjunction  with Google's Advanced Technology and Projects Group (ATAP) as part of Google's Spotlight Stories.

Plot
A celebration of life through the hand-drawn line, this film is about Mia and Tosh, two people and how growing up together to create an inspired duet.

Critical reception
The film garnered an Annie Award nomination for Best Animated Short Subject  and was even shortlisted for an Oscar in the same category.

References

External links

2014 films
2010s English-language films
2010s American animated films
2010s buddy films
2014 drama films
2014 fantasy films
2014 animated films
American animated fantasy films
American children's fantasy films
American coming-of-age films
Animated buddy films
Animated coming-of-age films
Animated drama films
American animated short films
Films directed by Glen Keane
Ballet films